Crevant-Laveine is a commune in the Puy-de-Dôme department in Auvergne-Rhône-Alpes in central France.

Places and monuments
Mountain castle, park by landscape architects, François-Marie Treyve and Joseph Marie. Château de la Terrasse, built from 1787 to 1790, by the architect Claude-François-Marie Attiret for Antoine Sablon du Corail (1762-1793) a close friend of the Count of Artois, who was inspired by Bagatelle to erect this castle. It is presented on a plan massed with two floors on basement, covered with a flat roof. The elements planned to crown the walls (balustrades, sculptures) were not carried out, as construction was halted due to the French Revolution. A dome was added in the 19th century.

Notable residents
Patrick Depailler: Formula 1 driver (° Clermont-Ferrand August 9, 1944, † Hockenheim (Germany) August 1, 1980) is buried in the town cemetery.

See also
Communes of the Puy-de-Dôme department

References

Crevantlaveine